Edward Jerome Moriarty (October 12, 1912 – September 29, 1991) was a Major League Baseball player. He played two seasons with the Boston Braves and Bees from 1935 to 1936.

References

External links

Boston Braves players
Boston Bees players
Major League Baseball second basemen
1912 births
1991 deaths
Baseball players from Massachusetts
Sportspeople from Holyoke, Massachusetts
Holy Cross Crusaders baseball players
Wilkes-Barre Barons (baseball) players
Syracuse Chiefs players
Scranton Miners players